Capel St Andrew is a village and a civil parish in the East Suffolk district, in the county of Suffolk, England. It is near the larger settlement of Orford.

Capel St Andrew is close to the River Butley, which is a tributary to the River Ore.  A small ferry service runs from close to Capel St Andrew across the River Butley and gives cyclists and walkers easy access to Orford.  To the east of the village lie the RSPB reserve at Boyton Marshes.

Capel St Andrew was referred to as Capeles in the Domesday Book, which is derived from the Latin for "chapel".  Despite being named after a church, the village does not have a church any more.  The church was demolished between 1529 and 1553.

Notes

Villages in Suffolk
Civil parishes in Suffolk
Suffolk Coastal